Mugshot was a social networking website created by Red Hat. Unlike most other social networking websites (which are concerned with advertising), it offered a desktop client and web widgets.

Mugshot was meant to facilitate real-world interactions with friends, and make one's normal computer use more social. It provided the functionality of a social network aggregator.

Licensing
The software that ran the Mugshot site is free software, and most of the client code is distributed under the terms of the GNU General Public License (GPL). Various parts of the server code are distributed under the GPL, the Open Software License 3.0, the Apache License, and the MIT License, all of which are free software licences.

Features
Site features included Web Swarm which let users share web links and join in conversations about them, Music Radar, which displayed which songs a user is listening to, and allowed conversations about the song.

Mugshot also integrated with many other sites, such as Twitter, Delicious, Digg, Facebook, Flickr, last.fm and YouTube. Many features were planned, including 'TV Party'.

Current status
From April 4 until May 11, 2009, the Mugshot website, mugshot.org, was down and displayed the following message: "Mugshot is currently not running". The website no longer resolves.

The mugshot SVN is still being maintained and hosted by Red Hat. There will be no further updates to the code base from the original development team from Red Hat.

References

Defunct websites
Red Hat
Defunct social networking services